The National Party was a far-right nationalist political party in the Czech Republic. Petra Edelmannová was the last leader of the party.

Ideology and program
They were strongly opposed to Czech membership of the European Union. Their main objectives were to restore a full national sovereignty by minimising influence of foreign institutions and to toughen the national immigration policies.

The Party proposed the so-called "A final solution to the Gypsy issue" to relocate the Roma population of the Czech Republic to India, based on perceived ethnic origins.

On 28 October 2007 the Czech National Party established a paramilitary National Guard.

Downfall
Decline in party membership started showing in 2009. Resignation of the party's leader Petra Edelmannová on 1 December 2009 caused a disintegration of party's leadership and speeded up the process of downfall.

The party was dissolved by the Supreme Administrative Court on 17 August 2011.

References

External links
List of Czech political parties (in Czech)
Second list of Czech political parties (in Czech)

Anti-Islam political parties in the Czech Republic
Anti-Romanyist parties in the Czech Republic
National conservative parties in the Czech Republic
Far-right political parties in the Czech Republic
Nationalist parties in the Czech Republic
Pan-Slavism
2002 establishments in the Czech Republic
Eurosceptic parties in the Czech Republic
Anti-communist parties in the Czech Republic
2011 disestablishments in the Czech Republic
Political parties established in 2002
Political parties disestablished in 2011